Ancient is a Norwegian black metal band from Bergen, formed in 1992. The band released six full-length albums released by Metal Blade Records to date and a variety of mini-albums, EPs and special releases. Ancient used to have the classic raw black metal sound, similar to Darkthrone's works. Beginning with The Cainian Chronicle, they moved towards a more Nordic/atmospheric black metal sound, akin to Emperor and a cleaner production. After a period of turmoil concerning their line-up, they went on to add gothic-style instruments such as violins, a female vocalist, and synthesizers to their music.

To this day Ancient can be considered one of the original Norwegian black metal bands that were part of the now famous scene of the early nineties. They were one of the first Norwegian black metal bands to sign for a semi-major label (Metal Blade Records). There is no evidence of any involvement of Ancient with the infamous occurrences of the Norwegian black metal scene, although they were part of the same scene. Ancient can be considered a historical black metal act by all standards, whose path took a different course upon their relocation around the world and subsequent exit from the local Norwegian scene.

History
The band initially started out as a solo project of guitarist Aphazel in 1992. The following year,  Grimm joined the band as drummer and vocalist. They released the Eerily Howling Winds demo in 1993 and the Det Glemte Riket EP in 1994. They subsequently signed to Listenable Records and released their debut album, Svartalvheim. After the release of the Trolltaar EP in 1995, Grimm left the band.

Aphazel later moved to the United States where he met Lord Kaiaphas of Virginia-based black metal band Grand Belial's Key, who soon became the new vocalist and drummer of Ancient. In 1996, the band signed a contract with Metal Blade Records (which led to sellout accusations), and two new members joined the band: Kimberly Goss as a female vocalist and keyboardist, and Kjetil as a drummer. Together, they recorded Ancient's second full-length album The Cainian Chronicle, a new guitarist/keyboardist entered Ancient under the name of Jesus Christ aka Luci and later embarked on a European tour.

In 1997, Goss was released from the band., Kjetil had left the band. With the new lineup, Aphazel, Kiaphas, Jesus Christ! began Writing, Erichte was recruited as the Female vocalist. Ancient released their third album, Mad Grandiose Bloodfiends A Black Metal Gothic classic. After a world tour, Aphazel met Deadly Kristin, who became the new female vocalist, and he decided to move to Italy.

1998 brought more lineup changes: Krigse took over the drums, Dhilorz became the new bassist, and Lord Kaiaphas left the band. In 1999, The Halls of Eternity was released, with Aphazel as the new vocalist. 

Upon the exit of Krigse, Ancient went on to find a replacement in the local metal scene. A new tour followed, including the band's first concerts in Scandinavia, and in 2000, Ancient played at Wacken Open Air main stage with the new drummer GroM who joined in May 2000. A compilation EP, God Loves the Dead, was released in January 2001, featuring some remixes, a new single and a cover of Iron Maiden's 'Powerslave' song.

Ancient's fifth album, Proxima Centauri, was recorded at Los Angered Recording (Andy LaRocque's studio) and mastered at Sterling Sound in New York by Chris Athens. Released in October 2001. Another world tour followed, including Mexico, Eastern Europe and Israel. Ancient then proceeded to move closer to their classic black metal origins and began the writing of a new album as a 4-piece without female vocals.

In July 2004, Ancient released their sixth album, Night Visit. Written in drummer Grom's studio at the feet of the Italian Alps, And Jesus Christ! writting in NJ; the album was recorded at Studio Fredman and mixed by Swedish producer Fredrik Nordström. Following the release, the band embarked on another European tour called "A Night VisiTour" in 2005, with Illdisposed as co-headliners and Final Breath as support. In the end of 2005, GroM left the band.

Aphazel and Deadly Kristin released an album with their side-project called 'Dreamlike Horror', for Greek label Sleaszy Rider Records in June 2005.

Live, the band featured Aleister of Faust (a cult Italian death metal band) on guitar and following Grom's departure, also featured Nick Barker (Cradle Of Filth, Dimmu Borgir) on drums.

Ancient's original demos, including Eerily Howling Winds, were re-released in 2005 in an album called Eerily Howling Winds - The Antediluvian Tapes.

In 2009 and 2010 they reformed for a new set of live shows in Spain and Portugal with Nick Barker as drummer.

Metal Blade has since then released a three-CD pack containing the band's three releases before the final Night Visit album: The Halls of Eternity, God Loves the Dead and Proxima Centauri.

In 2011, band's lead singer Aphazel announced that he had converted to Christianity, had shortened his artist name to Zel and also announced plans for a new studio album. The album, Back to the Land of the Dead, was released in 2016 by EMP Label Group, with the group subsequently signing with Soulseller Records. In early 2016 the band recruited guitarist Ghiulz (Bulldozer) as session guitarist for live performances.

Svartalvheim + Trolltaar 25th anniversary
Currently Ancient is touring Europe with the lineup Zel, guitarist Ghiulz (Death SS/Bulldozer), bassist Dhilorz and drumer Volkun (Morost/Sovrag). The tour began early 2020 to celebrate the jubilee of early records Svartalvheim and Trolltaar and went into a forced pause due to the lockdowns.

On december 2022 former drumer Grimm made a guest apearence on the concerts in the Netherlands and Belgium, joining to perform vocals on two songs (Eerily Howling Winds and Likferd). It was his first appearance with the band in 28 years.

Band members
Zel (formerly known as Aphazel) – guitar, keyboards (1992–present), lead vocals (1998–present), bass guitar (1992–1998), drum machine (1992–1993)
Dhilorz – bass guitar (1999-present)

 Former members
Grimm – vocals and drums (1993–1995)
Kimberly Goss – female vocals (1995–1997), keyboards (1997)
Deadly Kristin (born Cristina Parascandolo; changed name to Hayam Nur as Sufi) – vocals and black arts (1998–2003)
Lord Kaiaphas – vocals (1995–1999), drums (1995–1998)
Kjetil – drums (1996–1997)
Erichte – female vocals (1997–1998)
Krigse – drums (1998–2000)
 GroM – drums (2000–2005)
 Jesus Christ! (aka Luci) – keyboards (since 1997), guitar (1997–1998, 2004–), bass guitar (1997–1998), piano, cello (1997–1998) Carnygoat Music
 Nicholas Barker – drums (2009–?)
 Timeline

 Guest musicians
Neviah Luneville – vocals on "Envision the Beast" from Night Visit
Lady Omega – vocals on "Out in the Haunted Woods" from Night Visit
Moonbeam of Iblis – violin on "Envision the Beast" and "Night of the Stygian Souls" from Night Visit
Alex Azzali – additional guitars on "Night of the Stygian Souls" from Night Visit

 Live Members
Lazarus – keyboards (2002)
Scorpios – bass guitar (1998–1999)
Ghiulz – guitar (2016–present)
Volkun – drums

Discography
 Studio albums
Svartalvheim (1994)
The Cainian Chronicle (1996)
Mad Grandiose Bloodfiends (1997)
The Halls of Eternity (1999)
Proxima Centauri (2001)
Night Visit (2004)
Back to the Land of the Dead (2016)

 EPs
Det Glemte Riket (1994)
Trolltaar (1995)

 Demos
Eerily Howling Winds (1993)

 Compilations
Det Glemte Riket (1999)
God Loves the Dead (2001)
Eerily Howling Winds - The Antediluvian Tapes (2005)

References

External links
 
Ancient at Metal Blade Records
Carnygoat Music Jesus Christ! aka Luci Official website
Ancient at Sleaszy Rider Records
Rivadavia, Eduardo "[ The Cainian Chronicle Review]", Allmusic, Macrovision Corporation
Huey, Steve "[ Halls of Eternity Review]", AllMusic

Norwegian black metal musical groups
Metal Blade Records artists
Musical groups established in 1992
1992 establishments in Norway
Musical groups from Møre og Romsdal
Heavy metal musical groups from Washington, D.C.
Listenable Records artists